Chalermsak Aukkee (born 25 August 1994) is a Thai professional footballer who can play as a centre back for Thai League 1 club Police Tero and Thailand national team

International career
In 2022, he was called up by Thailand national team for friendly match against Nepal and Suriname and 2022 AFF Championship.

Honours

Club
BG Pathum United
 Thai League 2 (1) : 2019

International
Thailand
 AFF Championship :2022

References

External links
Chalermsak Aukkee at soccerway.com

1994 births
Living people
Chalermsak Aukkee
Chalermsak Aukkee
http://brandbiznews.com/news/detail/f8ac786f-a0d3-4506-8c82-35cceb5e86ca
Association football central defenders
Chalermsak Aukkee
Chalermsak Aukkee
Chalermsak Aukkee
Chalermsak Aukkee
Chalermsak Aukkee
Chalermsak Aukkee
Chalermsak Aukkee
Chalermsak Aukkee
Chalermsak Aukkee
Chalermsak Aukkee